The Estado Falcon gecko (Gonatodes falconensis) is a species of lizard in the Sphaerodactylidae family native to Venezuela.

References

Gonatodes
Reptiles described in 1947